Jesse Bailey Watters (born July 9, 1978) is an American conservative political commentator on Fox News. He frequently appeared on the political talk show The O'Reilly Factor and was known for his man-on-the-street interviews, featured in his segment "Watters' World", which would become its own show in 2015. In January 2017, Watters' World became weekly, and in April 2017, he became a co-host of the roundtable series The Five. In 2021, he published his first book, How I Saved the World. In January of 2022, Watters became host of Jesse Watters Primetime.

Early life and education 

Watters was raised in Philadelphia, Pennsylvania, son of Stephen Hapgood Watters, a teacher, and child psychologist Anne Purvis, daughter of Morton Bailey, Jr., publisher of Better Homes and Gardens magazine. Her grandfather, Morton Bailey, published The Saturday Evening Post; his father was the politician Morton S. Bailey. Watters' paternal grandfather, Franklin Benjamin Watters, was a cardiologist at the Veterans Administration Hospital at Newington, Connecticut, and a professor at the University of Connecticut Medical Dental School. He has some Irish ancestry on his father's side. Watters is named after his mother's great-grandfather Jesse Andrew Burnett, an associate chief justice of the Kansas Supreme Court.

Watters grew up in the Germantown and then East Falls neighborhoods. He attended the William Penn Charter School through junior year, before moving with his family to Long Island in New York. In 2001, he graduated from Trinity College in Hartford, Connecticut, with a B.A. in history.

Career
After his graduation, Watters began work as a production assistant at Fox News. In 2003, he moved to the production staff of The O'Reilly Factor, and in 2004 he began to appear on air in segments of O'Reilly's show.

On June 11, 2014, Watters debuted on the Fox News show Outnumbered, later occasionally appearing as a guest co-host. On November 20, 2015, Watters debuted his own monthly Fox News program, Watters' World. While Watters is characterized as an "ambush journalist", Watters has said, "I try to make it enjoyable for the person I'm interviewing. We always come away from the interview all smiles, for the most part. And it's always fun to come back and look at the footage and say, 'Oh my gosh, what just happened?'" In January 2017, Watters' World became a weekly show, airing Saturdays at 8 p.m. ET.

In April 2017, Watters became a co-host of the roundtable series The Five.

In April 2021, HarperCollins announced the publication of Watters' new book How I Saved the World, which was published on July 6. The book debuted at number one on The New York Times nonfiction best-seller list for the week ending July 10, 2021.

After serving as one of several rotating fill-in hosts in the network's 7 PM time slot, it was announced on January 10, 2022 that Watters would become the permanent host of a new primetime show, titled Jesse Watters Primetime, which debuted on January 24, 2022. 

Watters' World ended on January 15, 2022, while Watters continues to serve as co-host of The Five.

Controversies

Amanda Terkel "ambush"
In 2009, on assignment for The O'Reilly Factor, Watters and his cameraman followed journalist Amanda Terkel in her car for two hours while she drove to Winchester, VA for vacation, and then accosted her to ask her questions about an article she wrote that was critical of Bill O'Reilly.

Seven years later, at a journalists' reception, The Huffington Post's Ryan Grim approached Watters with his phone camera running and asked him to walk over to Terkel and apologize. Watters at first said he would apologize and then said he wouldn't, adding, "I ambushed her because O'Reilly told me to get her because she said some bad shit." 

Video of the incident shows Watters then grabbing Grim's phone and throwing it on the floor, and later grabbing it again and putting it in his pocket. Eventually, the two got into a shoving match, as Grim attempted to recover his phone. Watters later commented on the incident on The O'Reilly Factor, stating, "I was at this party trying to enjoy myself. This guy came up to me. He starts putting it in my face."

Terkel wrote that Watters' response was "surprising", considering that "Watters' way of confronting his subjects is to thrust cameras in their faces unexpectedly and pepper them with aggressive questions."

Chinatown segment
In October 2016, Watters was criticized for a segment of Watters' World that was widely considered racist toward Asian Americans. In New York City's Chinatown, Watters asked Chinese Americans if they knew karate (a Japanese word), if he should bow before he greets them, or if their watches were stolen. Throughout the segment, the 1974 song "Kung Fu Fighting" plays in the background, and the interviews are interspersed with references to martial arts and clips of Watters getting a foot massage and playing with nunchucks. New York City mayor Bill de Blasio denounced Watters' segment as "vile, racist behavior" that "has no place in our city". Numerous other lawmakers and journalists, including Asian Americans Mazie Hirono and Judy Chu, also condemned Watters. The segment was also criticized by the Asian American Journalists Association, which issued a statement saying, "We should be far beyond tired, racist stereotypes and targeting an ethnic group for humiliation and objectification on the basis of their race."

On October 5, Watters tweeted what Variety's Will Thorne called a "non-apology" about the segment. In the two tweets, Watters stated that "My man-on-the-street interviews are meant to be taken as tongue-in-cheek and I regret if anyone found offense. ... As a political humorist, the Chinatown segment was intended to be a light piece, as all Watters' World segments are."

John Podesta comments
In January 2017, Watters faulted John Podesta, Hillary Clinton's campaign manager, for the theft of Podesta's emails by Russian hackers, saying, "What happened was John Podesta gave his password to a hacker. And guess what his password was. 'Password.' It's a true story. His password was 'password.'" The fact-checking website PolitiFact rated Watters' claim "False."

Ivanka Trump comments
In April 2017, two days after joining The Five as co-host, Watters made an on-air comment about Ivanka Trump that was criticized as lewd. After viewing footage of Trump speaking on a panel about female entrepreneurship, Watters commented, "So I don't really get what's going on here, but I really liked how she was speaking into that microphone," as he parodied holding the microphone as a phallic symbol. Watters denied his comment was sexual, saying in a statement: "During the break we were commenting on Ivanka's voice and how it was low and steady and resonates like a smooth jazz radio DJ ... This was in no way a joke about anything else." In response to the criticism, Watters was not on the show for two days that week.

QAnon comments
In July 2020, Jesse Watters praised the conspiracy theory QAnon during his show, saying: "they've also uncovered a lot of great stuff when it comes to Epstein and it comes to the deep state. I never saw Q as dangerous as antifa." After public backlash, Watters released a statement saying: "I mentioned the conspiracy group QAnon, which I don't support or believe in. My comments should not be mistaken for giving credence to this fringe platform."

Anthony Fauci comments
At Turning Point USA's 2022 AmericaFest conference, while advocating for attendees to aggressively confront and question Dr. Anthony Fauci about his alleged funding of gain-of-function research at the Wuhan Institute of Virology, Watters said, "Now you go in for the kill shot. The kill shot? With an ambush? Deadly. Because he doesn't see it coming." Fauci responded by calling Watters' remarks "awful" and said that Watters "should be fired on the spot". Fox News indicated their support for Watters, saying he "was using a metaphor", and that his comments "had been twisted completely out of context".

Personal life
Watters is registered to vote as a member of the Conservative Party of New York State. He married Noelle Inguagiato in 2009 and had twin daughters with her. Noelle filed for divorce in 2018 after Watters admitted to an affair with a producer on his show, Emma DiGiovine. Inguagiato and Watters' divorce was finalized in March 2019. Watters announced his engagement to DiGiovine in August 2019 and they married in December of the same year. Their son was born in 2021.

Bibliography

See also
 New Yorkers in journalism

References

External links 

 

1978 births
American male journalists
American television journalists
Television producers from Pennsylvania
Fox News people
Living people
Journalists from Pennsylvania
Television personalities from Philadelphia
Trinity College (Connecticut) alumni
William Penn Charter School alumni